Tecoma capensis, the Cape honeysuckle, is a species of flowering plant in the family Bignoniaceae, native to southern Africa. Despite its common name, it is not closely related to the true honeysuckle.

Description

Normally evergreen, it may lose its leaves in colder climates. In certain habitats it may scramble, meaning that it shoots out long growth tips which lean on the stems and branches of other plants, as well as boulders, trellises, fences and walls; this can lead to the plant appearing untidy. They are opposite, slightly serrated, green to dark-green, and pinnate with 5 to 9 oblong leaflets.

The flower colour ranges from orange to orange-red to apricot.

Distribution
The species occurs naturally in South Africa, Eswatini and southern Mozambique. It is cultivated in other areas of the world, such as in South-east Asia, Hawaii, Florida, and California. It can be considered invasive in remote islands such as the Azores (as seen at the island of São Miguel, near Ponta Garça).

Cultivation
Tecoma capensis has been in cultivation for many years and is often used for hedging, as it is a scrambling shrub. It can be propagated from cuttings or by removing rooted suckers during the active growth phase.

It can be planted in semi-shade to full sun. Otherwise it can be grown in a container and taken indoors through the winter months. To keep this shrub clean and tidy, it must be pruned back in late winter to promote new growth and flowers. The application of a balanced fertilizer after pruning will enhance the growth and flowering.

This plant has gained the Royal Horticultural Society's Award of Garden Merit.

Ecology
Tecoma capensis is an excellent plant to use in a wildlife garden in Southern Africa, since it is popular with sunbirds and certain insects due to its nectar. As a scrambler, it can be quite dense (if pruned) and as such can be utilised as a nesting site by a few bird species.

The larvae of the death's head hawkmoth (Acherontia atropos) and the fulvous hawkmoth (Coelonia mauritii) eat the leaves of this plant.

Gallery

References

capensis
Flora of Mozambique
Flora of South Africa
Flora of Swaziland
Garden plants
Plants described in 1800